Family Groove is the sixth studio album by the Neville Brothers. Rose of Sharon Witmer writes in her AllMusic review, "This is vintage Neville Brothers philosophy delivered as always with the funky beat and unique Neville sound that has captivated fans all over the world."

Track listing

Personnel

Musicians
Aaron Neville – vocals
Art Neville – keyboards, vocals
Cyril Neville – percussion, vocals
Charles Neville – saxophone
Willie Green – drums
Tony Hall – bass
Eric Struthers – guitar
David "Hawk" Wolinski – keyboards, guitar, drums
John Moore – guitar on track 7
Daryl Johnson – rhythm guitar, backing vocals on track 8
Jason Neville – rap on track 2
Steve Miller – guitar, vocals on track 1
Mervin Campbell – trumpet
Curtis Watcon – trumpet
Emanuel Steib – trombone
Greg Tardy – tenor saxophone
Ricky Caesar – tuba

Production
Producer: David "Hawk" Wolinski, David Leonard, The Neville Brothers
Recording and mixing: David Leonard
Engineer assistant: Steve Homelfarb, Trina Shoemaker
Mastering: Steve Hall, Wally Traugott
Production manager and keyboard technician: Eric Kolb
Production assistant: Dave Cheramie
Drum technician: Kelsey Smith
D-Drum technician: Guy Gelso
Assistand keyboard technician: Michael Paz
Design: Len Peltier, Peter Grant
Art direction: Len Peltier
Photography: Guzman

Charts

References

1992 albums
A&M Records albums
The Neville Brothers albums
Albums produced by David Leonard (record producer)